Martin County is a county in the U.S. state of Texas. As of the 2010 census, its population was 5,237. Its county seat is Stanton. The county was created in 1876 and organized in 1884. It is named for Wylie Martin, an early settler.

Until November 2018, Martin County was one of six entirely dry counties in Texas. During that month, Martin County changed from a dry county to a partially wet county after Stanton residents voted to approve the sale of beer and wine within city limits. Five dry counties remain.

Martin County is included in the Midland–Odessa combined statistical area.

Geography
The northern portion of the Spraberry Trend, the second-largest oil field in the United States by 2013 estimated crude oil production, underlies much of the county.

Major highways

Adjacent counties
 Dawson County (north)
 Howard County (east)
 Glasscock County (southeast)
 Midland County (south)
 Andrews County (west)
 Gaines County (northwest)

Demographics

Note: the US Census treats Hispanic/Latino as an ethnic category. This table excludes Latinos from the racial categories and assigns them to a separate category. Hispanics/Latinos can be of any race.

As of the census of 2000, there were 4,746 people, 1,624 households, and 1,256 families residing in the county.  The population density was 5 people per square mile (2/km2).  There were 1,894 housing units at an average density of 2 per square mile (1/km2).  The racial makeup of the county was 79.01% White, 1.58% Black or African American, 0.82% Native American, 0.17% Asian, 16.06% from other races, and 2.36% from two or more races.  40.56% of the population were Hispanic or Latino of any race.

There were 1,624 households, out of which 42.70% had children under the age of 18 living with them, 64.30% were married couples living together, 9.50% had a female householder with no husband present, and 22.60% were non-families. 21.70% of all households were made up of individuals, and 11.80% had someone living alone who was 65 years of age or older.  The average household size was 2.87 and the average family size was 3.36.

In the county, the population was spread out, with 33.90% under the age of 18, 6.70% from 18 to 24, 26.40% from 25 to 44, 19.70% from 45 to 64, and 13.30% who were 65 years of age or older.  The median age was 32 years. For every 100 females there were 95.60 males.  For every 100 females age 18 and over, there were 92.70 males.

The median income for a household in the county was $31,836, and the median income for a family was $35,965. Males had a median income of $29,360 versus $19,063 for females. The per capita income for the county was $15,647.  About 14.90% of families and 18.70% of the population were below the poverty line, including 23.90% of those under age 18 and 17.10% of those age 65 or over.

Media
The county is served by a weekly newspaper, local station KKJW (FM), nearby stations KBXJ (FM) and KPET (AM), and the various Midland and Odessa radio and TV stations.

Communities

Cities
 Ackerly (partly in Dawson County)
 Midland (mostly in Midland County)
 Stanton (county seat)

Unincorporated communities
 Lenorah
 Tarzan

Politics

See also

 National Register of Historic Places listings in Martin County, Texas
 Recorded Texas Historic Landmarks in Martin County

References

External links
 Martin County Government’s Website
 

 
1876 establishments in Texas
Populated places established in 1876